Feni is a district located in southeastern Bangladesh. It was a part of the Greater Noakhali, Comilla, Chittagong and Tripura. , the district's estimated population stood at 1,437,371, making it the ninth-most populous district in Chittagong Division. The administrative hub of the district is in Feni City, which also serves as the headquarters of Feni Sadar Upazila in the central section of the district. The original name of the district was Shamshernagar, which served as a mahakuma under the district of Noakhali (greater part), Comilla (few part) and Chittagong District (at rest) until 6 December 1984. It is the 64th Number Districts of Bangladesh. The district consists of six sub-districts: Sonagazi, Fulgazi, Parshuram, Daganbhuiyan, Chhagalnaiya and Feni Sadar.

History 

In the opinion of most historians, the area of this district is more ancient than the other areas of the greater Noakhali region. Many archaeological antiquities were found in this district which proves the claim. In ancient times, maximum area of the Noakhali region was under water except this area.

Before 1984, it was a mahakuma of Noakhali district. In 1872–74, Amirgaon thana which was established by the Mughals was facing river erosion. Then it was moved to Khaiarat which was situated by the river Feni. Then this area was known as Feni because of the river. It was established as a mahakuma with three thanas named Mirsarai, Chhagalnaiya and Amirgaon in 1875. Later, Mirsarai was included in Chittagong District. In 1976, a new mahakuma was established and the Khaiarat thana was moved to this new mahakuma and the mahakuma was named Feni. The first headquarter of the mahakuma was in Amirgaon thana. It was moved to Feni in 1881.

Etymology 
The name "Feni" was derived from Feni river. The name "Feni" ( ফেনী in Bengali language) can be found in the literary works of poets during the 16th century as river stream and as a ghat for ferry crossing. Kbindra Parameshwar used the word describing the description of Paragalpur. In 17th century, in the Persian book "Baharistan-i-Ghaibi" , written by Mirza Nathan the word "Feni" became "Feni". In the literary works of poets, the word was used as a river.

Geography 
Feni has a total area of 928.34 km2. It has boundaries with Comilla District and Tripura state of India in the north, Chittagong District and Bay of Bengal in the south, Chittagong District and Tripura state in the east and Noakhali District in the west. Feni District has 6 upazilas and 43 unions. Feni, Mahuri, Kuhuri, Silonia and Kalidas Pahalia river are some of the major rivers of the district. Total forest area in the district is 2179.22 hectares.

Administration
Feni District has 6 upazilas, 6 thanas, 5 municipalities, 43 unions, 564 villages and 540 mouzas.

Demographics 

According to the 2011 Bangladesh census, Feni District had a population of 1,437,371, of which 694,128 were males and 743,243 females. Rural population was 1,143,629 (79.56%) while the urban population was 293,742 (20.44%). Feni district had a literacy rate of 59.63% for the population 7 years and above: 61.11% for males and 58.28% for females.

Majority of the people of this area are Muslim. 94.12% are Muslims, 5.83% Hindus. The population density is about 1451 people per square kilometer.

Economy 
The main occupation of the people of the district are agriculture & Foreign Remittance. The main source of incomes are: agriculture 21%, non-agricultural labourer 2.57%, industry 35%, commerce 15.98%, transport and communication 4.66%, construction 1.86%, religious service 0.43%, rent and remittance 11.53% and others 12.19%. There are two industrial areas in this district. Total number of heavy industries are 4, medium industries are 17, small industries are 826 and cottage industries are 3419. There is a gas field in Dhalia union of Feni sadar area. Total area of agriculture land is 75,922 hectares and arable land is 74,720 hectare.

Education 
The literacy rate of the district is 59.60%. There are many of degree college, 10 higher secondary colleges, one girls' cadet college, one polytechnic institute, one computer institute, 155 high schools, 19 junior secondary schools, 97 madrasas, one teachers training college, one primary teacher's training institute and 528 government primary schools. Major educational institutions are:
College
Feni Medical College (1997-2004)
Feni College
Alhaz Abdul Haque Chowdhury Degree College
Feni Girls' Cadet College
Shaheen Academy School & College
Hazari College
Diploma Institute
Feni Polytechnic Institute
Institute of Computer Science & Technology.Feni 
Compact Polytechnic Institute
Feni Computer Institute
High School
Feni Government Pilot High School
Feni Govt. Girls' High School
Chhagalnaya Govt. Pilot High School
Chhagalnaiya Govt. Girls High School]]
Dharmapur Educational Estate
Atatürk Government Model High School
Baligaon High School
Motobi Adarsha High School
Hokdi Ideal Schools
Adarsha High School, Farhadnagar
Madrasah
Aftab bibi Fazil Madrasah

Health 
There are one modern government general hospital, 5 upazila health complexes, one heart foundation hospital, one diabetic hospital, one chest disease clinic (Tuberculosis), one trauma center, one mother and child care center, one nursing training institute, 19 union health centers, 33 union family care centers and 114 community clinics.

There was a private medical college named Feni Medical College from 1997 to 2004.

Transport 
There is direct connection to the district from Dhaka. Total length of national highway is 31 km (Dhaka-Chittagong) and 20 km (Feni-Noakhali). Total length of concrete road is 1044.85 km, half-concrete road is 87.96 km and dirt road is 2,132.96 km. Star line travels, S. Alam travels, Keya travels, Saudia travels, Shyamoli travels, Sohag travels, Unique travels, Green Line travels etc. are major inter-division bus travel agencies.

Mahanagar Pravati, Paharika, Meghna, Udayan, Mahanagar Godhuli. Turnanishitha, Chattagram Mail, Karnaphuli, Jalalabad, Sagarika and Mymensingh Express are the trains servicing the district to travel various district.

Member of the 11th parliament 
Reference:

Notable people 
 Khaleda Zia, First female Prime minister of Bangladesh. 
 Abul Kalam Azad Chowdhury former Vice Chancellor of the University of Dhaka
 Anwarullah Chowdhury Vice-chancellor of the University of Dhaka
 Aurangzeb Chowdhury, Chief of Navy
 Habibullah Bahar Chowdhury, first health minister of East Pakistan, one of the founders of Mohammedan Sporting Club (Kolkata)
 Selim Al Deen, notable playwright and theater artist
 Zafar Imam, Bangladeshi Politician. 
 Kamal Ahmed Majumdar, Bangladeshi Politician 
 Shahidullah Kaiser, novelist and journalist
 Shamsunnahar Mahmud, politician and educator.
 Selina Parvin, writer and journalist
 Zahir Raihan, Film director and writer
 Giasuddin Selim, Film director.
 Mohammad Saifuddin, Bangladeshi cricketer.
 Abdus Salam, Bengali language movement protester
 Abdus Salam, former editor of the Pakistan Observer (later the Bangladesh Observer). Ekushey Padak winning journalist

Shihab Shaheen, Bangladeshi filmm
aker and director.
Iqbal Sobhan, Bangladeshi Journalist 
Joynal Hazari, Bangladeshi Politician
Saber H Chowdhury, Politician and former Chairman of BCB
Abdul Awal, Bangladeshi Politician
Khawaja Ahmed, member of the 1st Bangladeshi Parliament

See also
Khondoler misti

Notes

References

External links

 Feni District Administration

 
Districts of Chittagong Division
Districts of Bangladesh